Luk Keng is an area in the North District of Hong Kong.

Administration
Luk Keng is one of the villages represented within the Sha Tau Kok District Rural Committee. For electoral purposes, Luk Keng is part of the Sha Ta constituency, which is currently represented by Ko Wai-kei.

Location
Luk Keng is located in the northeastern part of the New Territories, to the south west of Sha Tau Kok, east of Nam Chung and to the south of the Starling Inlet (Sha Tau Kok Hoi).

History
At the time of the 1911 census, the population of Luk Keng was 484. The number of males was 182.

Villages
Luk Keng contains several villages, including:
Luk Keng Chan Uk
Luk Keng Lam Uk 
Luk Keng Wong Uk

Features
Luk Keng is the site of a World War II network of defense, comprising a trench system and 14 pillboxes, built during the Japanese occupation of Hong Kong. The network is located on a 120 m hill overlooking Starling Inlet. The Luk Keng Pillboxes and Observation Posts have been listed as Grade II historic buildings.

Transportation
The closest station to Luk Keng on the MTR is Fanling station. Green minibus No. 56K runs to the Luk Keng terminus.

References

External links

 Approved Luk Keng and Wo Hang Outline Zoning Plan
 Pictures of Luk Keng
 Pictures of Luk Keng pillboxes

Populated places in Hong Kong
Sha Tau Kok